Fall Guys (formerly known as Fall Guys: Ultimate Knockout) is a free-to-play platform battle royale game developed by Mediatonic. The game involves up to 60 players who control jellybean-like creatures and compete against each other in a series of randomly selected mini-games, such as obstacle courses or tag. Players are eliminated as the rounds progress until, eventually, the last remaining player is crowned the winner. The game draws inspiration from game shows like Takeshi's Castle, It's a Knockout, Wipeout, and playground games like tag and British Bulldog.

The game was released by Devolver Digital for PlayStation 4 and Windows on 4 August 2020. Following their acquisition of Mediatonic, the publishing rights were transferred to Epic Games. Subsequently, the game was made free-to-play on 21 June 2022 and released on additional platforms including Nintendo Switch, PlayStation 5, Xbox One and Xbox Series X/S, with full cross-platform play support among all platforms. As part of the transition, the game adapted a seasonal battle pass system for its monetisation, offering avatar customisations to players.

Fall Guys received positive reviews from critics for its chaotic gameplay and visual appearance. The game was a commercial success, selling more than 10 million copies and attracting more than 50 million players after the game went free-to-play. Since the game's launch, Mediatonic has released numerous updates for the game. The ninth and current season is underwater themed.

Gameplay
Up to 40 players compete in shows with battle royale-style gameplay. Players, represented as jellybean-like figures, move around in a three-dimensional playing field, with additional moves such as jumping, grabbing/climbing, or diving to assist gameplay. The aim is to qualify for subsequent rounds by successfully completing each of the randomly selected mini-games with randomly selected variations. Certain mini-games involve running towards a finish line at the end of the map, surviving, and playing tag with other players, while others add elements of teamwork. On every mini-game, obstacles appear around the map for added complexity. Players who are too slow, who fall into pink slime, or who fail certain requirements for a mini-game, are eliminated. In the final round, the remaining few players compete in a final match with a randomised mini-game designed for a smaller player size. The winner of the match is the last player standing or the first to finish.

Using an in-game currency, "Kudos", players can purchase single cosmetics, nameplates, nametags, patterns, faceplates, colours, and emotes for their character to show off in-game. Players obtain Kudos by doing daily challenges and get crowns by winning a match. Crowns were a premium currency until 21 June 2022, whereas they now only count towards Crown Rank. Any Crowns that users didn't spend before the game went free to play were converted into Kudos.

Fall Guys regularly hosts new seasons approximately every 3 to 6 months, hosting a new theme and additional content every season.

Season 2 added the ability to choose different shows with a different selection

Season 4 added the "Crown Shards" currency, earned by playing in Squad Mode, where a team of four other players cooperates to earn points to progress to the next round, or by completing daily challenges. Crown Shards will be automatically converted for additional Crowns.

Season 5 added limited time events, where players need to do certain challenges to earn exclusive costumes and other types of cosmetics. In game events usually last between one and seven days and can sometimes be based on different franchises, such as Ratchet & Clank, Aloy from Horizon Zero Dawn, Jungle Book, etc.

Sweet Thieves was added in Season 6, where one team is invisible (only being visible when moving fast) while the other team is not. The invisible team (Thieves) needs to bring sweets to the goals while the other team (Guardians) is trying to prevent them by using the grabbing mechanic to capture the Thieves and put them in a jail. A button can be pressed every 30 seconds to remove the jail barrier.

Season 1: Free for All added Show Bucks, a premium in game currency that can be used to purchase full costumes, premium colours, patterns, faceplates, emotes, and the current paid Season Pass. Players are only able to obtain Show Bucks through the Season Pass or by purchasing it via microtransactions.

The same season added Bean Hill Zone, the first-ever limited time collaboration round with Sega. The round came with a limited time event and its own show. In Season 3: Sunken Secrets the round was added to Solo Show.

New costumes are regularly added, usually for a limited time. Some are of characters from different video games and media franchises, such as Half-Life, Portal, Godzilla, Team Fortress 2, Sonic the Hedgehog, Doom, Hotline Miami, Ratchet & Clank, Cuphead, Among Us, Little Big Planet, Astro's Playroom, Assassin's Creed, Hatsune Miku, SpongeBob SquarePants, and so on.

Seasons

As Fall Guys: Ultimate Knockout

As Fall Guys

Development
The conception of what became Fall Guys began when Mediatonic was discussing another project in January 2018. Lead designer Joe Walsh said that it reminded him of game shows such as Takeshi's Castle and Total Wipeout. He drew from that inspiration to create a pitch document for what would become Fall Guys. Originally titled Fools' Gauntlet, (also later under development using the name "Stumble Chums"), Walsh's pitch featured 100 players competing in a battle royale composed of physical challenges. Creative director Jeff Tanton, while initially sceptical that creating another battle royale game would be successful, was quickly convinced of the game's potential, and forwarded Walsh's pitch to Mediatonic's founders.

Tanton and Walsh worked on a pitch deck, and principal concept artist Dan Hoang created images featuring colourful, bean-shaped characters racing on an obstacle course in the sky. Tanton explained that Hoang's character designs helped shift the focus of the game away from the obstacle course itself, to the characters. With the pitch deck completed, Tanton pitched the game to 10 different publishers at the 2018 Game Developers Conference. Six months after Devolver Digital agreed to publish the game, development began.

Fall Guys began its initial prototyping process with a small team, growing to 30 people during development. Initial progress on individual minigames was slow which caused the team to worry that there wouldn't be enough content for launch. A turning point came when the team made a group of pillars that "Took the opinions of people out of the occasion" and allowed the developers to "kill ideas faster". Such pillars include ensuring a minigame was "50-50 chaos and skill" and that a level had to be "different every time". Inspired by game shows, and differentiating from first-person shooter battle royale games, Mediatonic focused on gameplay variety. By presenting the player with several, randomised rounds of game modes, Mediatonic hoped to recreate the experience of being on a game show. To help keep the "spirit of playground games and game shows", Mediatonic created an internal rule that game modes needed to be explained in three words. Over time, the game underwent numerous other changes. The player count was decreased from 100 to 60, because overpopulated games "stopped being readable or fun". In testing, Mediatonic noted that players overestimated the number of players, stating "we didn't need as many players as we thought to create the crowds we wanted the gameplay to include."

It's a Knockout, a game show forcing contestants to dress up in oversized costumes, inspired the idea that the characters should "have that element of being completely uniquely, badly designed for the task that we were gonna put them through". The ragdoll physics is deliberate, to avoid "hyper athletic Ninja Warrior characters" and because "falling over is funny". According to Walsh, striking the right balance between funny ragdoll collisions and game performance was critical, because "as soon as you lose the ragdoll-ness of the character, you lose the comedy". The character designs were inspired by the look of vinyl toys.

Mediatonic began working on season 2 before the game's release with level designer Joseph Juson, noting that it was more of an "expansion" compared to season 3 where the team tried to bring new ideas.

Release
Fall Guys: Ultimate Knockout was announced at E3 in June 2019 and was released on 4 August 2020 for PlayStation 4 and Windows. Several updates ensued for the first season and on 8 October 2020, the medieval-themed second season was released. The success prompted more hiring.

The Chinese company Bilibili announced in August 2020 that it would be developing a mobile version for Android and iOS that would be exclusive to China.

In February 2021, Fall Guys was announced for Nintendo Switch, Xbox One, and Xbox Series X, scheduled for mid 2021. However, in April 2021, these versions of the game were delayed to 2022, citing greater focus on cross-compatibility among all versions of the game.

In March 2021, Mediatonic and its parent company, Tonic Games Group, were bought by Epic Games. Epic Games later announced that they will focus on adding cross-platform compatibility for all versions of Fall Guys, utilising resources from games such as Fortnite that became available after acquisition by Epic Games.

On 18 November 2021, Mediatonic announced that Epic Games Accounts will be required in season 6 allowing cross-platform progression between PS4 and Steam and the ability to have custom names for Steam players. On 22 February 2022, Mediatonic released an update adding Lobbies and Friends lists. This uses the Epic Overlay system that games like Fortnite or Rocket League have to invite anyone on any platform via Epic Games Accounts.

On 15 March 2022, Mediatonic announced that starting 5 April 2022 there would be a new launcher that all PlayStation players would need to download to keep playing the game on PlayStation. On 9 May 2022, the old PlayStation launcher shut down and became unusable. Both launchers were the same besides the new one being published by Epic Games instead of Devolver Digital. People who downloaded the new launcher would be able to redeem a free DLC Pink Shark costume that was able to be redeemed until the end of season 6.

Mediatonic and Epic Games transitioned Fall Guys to a free-to-play system alongside its 21 June release on Xbox One, Xbox Series X/S and Nintendo Switch. Additionally, a dedicated PlayStation 5 version also released, featuring enhanced visuals and DualSense effects. The game was also rebranded as simply Fall Guys, without the Ultimate Knockout subtitle. To support the free-to-play model, the game included a new season pass system with both a free and premium tier of rewards, the latter available to those that purchase the premium pass with real-world funds. For Windows, the game was removed from the Steam storefront and made available on Epic Games Store, though the Steam version will continue to be updated in sync with the Epic Games Store version. The free-to-play versions of Fall Guys also added support for cross-platform play with other platforms. Legacy players who had purchased Fall Guys before this transition were given a "Legacy Pack" that includes cosmetics, costumes, and the Season 1: Free for All premium season pass for free.

In July 2022, a bug was discovered that unintentionally bought items from the in-game store instead of previewing them. Initially deemed by Mediatonic as "not an issue", they later acknowledged it as a bug after complaints mounted. On 1 November 2022 an update was issued to include a hold-to-purchase mechanic for all in-game purchases similar to the mechanic in Fortnite.

In November 2022, Mediatonic announced on Twitter of a new feature called Vaulting where some rounds will be temporarily removed to increase stability across all platforms.

Reception

Fall Guys received "generally favourable" reviews, according to review aggregator website Metacritic.

Tom Wiggins of Stuff magazine praised the game, calling it "Super Monkey Ball for the Fortnite generation". Mercury News praised the "controlled chaos" gameplay of Fall Guys, stating it to be utilising a combination of the elements from the battle royale game Fortnite and the party game Mario Party in such a way that made it "tailored to the coronavirus age". Ollie Toms from Rock, Paper, Shotgun praised Fall Guys for its creative approach as a battle royale game incorporating family-friendly elements rather than resorting to violent themes. He praised the simplicity of the game and the diversity of content added with each season. He argues that the ragdoll physics can be both exciting and frustrating to play: "What really makes and breaks this game is the imprecision of your actions. It's not something many competitive games can get away with in the way Fall Guys does."

The weekend before release during a closed beta, Fall Guys briefly became the most-watched game on Twitch as well as the sixth-best-selling Steam game where it was available for pre-order.

Fall Guys has been frequently compared to Among Us, in that both are online games which grew in popularity during the COVID-19 pandemic.

The addition of Squad Mode in season 4 has been positively received. Kotaku says it evokes a new perspective on intense gameplay, indicating the importance of teamwork. The addition of Sweet Thieves has been positively received. The website Destructoid says "This is the most fun I've had with Fall Guys in forever." and "If you care about trophies, Sweet Thieves is worth checking out. But it stands on its own, too."

On 11 October 2022 the hashtag #savefallguys started trending on Twitter. This was to get Mediatonic's attention and ask the company to fix numerous problems that fans have with the game including lack of round variety, bugs, sub par events, prices in the in-game shop, how skill based matchmaking is implemented, and more. On 15 November 2022 the Fall Guys Twitter stated that in order for the game to stay stable some rounds will be "vaulted" and rounds will be rotated in and out of the vault. Fans didn't take the news well citing how removing pre existing rounds doesn't help the game and makes the game lose its replayability. This sparked another hashtag #unvaultfallguys starting on 20 January 2023.

Sales
Within 24 hours of release, the game had an active player base of more than 1.5 million players. On 10 August 2020, Devolver Digital announced 2 million copies sold on Steam. During the first day of release, the servers for Fall Guys were unexpectedly overloaded due to popularity.

The game's popularity brought several brand collaborations for custom content. Shortly after release Mediatonic announced a fundraiser by which the brand that donated the most money to the charity SpecialEffect would have their custom skin featured in the game.

By 26 August 2020, more than 7 million copies of Fall Guys had been sold on Steam, and it was the most downloaded monthly PS Plus game of all time. By November 2020, the game had reached more than 10 million sales on Steam. Multiple outlets described the game's popularity as a "phenomenon". In December 2020, Mediatonic confirmed sales of more than 11 million copies on PC.

In June 2022, within two weeks of going free-to-play and its release on multiple consoles, Fall Guys player count rose to over 50 million.

Awards

Notes

References

External links
 

2020 video games
2020s fads and trends
3D platform games
Android (operating system) games
Battle royale games
Devolver Digital games
Epic Games games
Free-to-play video games
Golden Joystick Award winners
Impact of the COVID-19 pandemic on the video game industry
IOS games
Indie video games
Minigame compilations
Multiplayer online games
Nintendo Switch games
Obstacle racing
PlayStation 4 games
PlayStation 5 games
Racing video games
The Game Awards winners
Video games developed in the United Kingdom
Video games scored by Jukio Kallio
Video games with cross-platform play
Xbox One games
Xbox Series X and Series S games
D.I.C.E. Award for Online Game of the Year winners